The Eglinton Theatre, (or Eglinton Grand) is an event venue and cinema in Toronto, Ontario, Canada. In 2016, it was designated a National Historic Site by Parks Canada and the Historic Sites and Monuments Board of Canada.

Built in 1936, the Eglinton became one of the best examples of the Art Deco-style in Canadian theatre design. In 1937, architectural firm  Kaplan & Sprachman was awarded the Royal Architecture Institute of Canada's Bronze Medal for their design of the theatre.
From 1965 to 1967, the "Sound of Music" played for 146 weeks.

It operated as a cinema for 67 years, until 2003, after which it was converted to an event venue.

See also
 List of cinemas in Toronto

External links
 Official website

References

National Historic Sites in Ontario
Cinemas and movie theatres in Toronto
Former cinemas in Toronto
Designated heritage properties in Ontario